The Roman Catholic Diocese of Posadas is a Catholic diocese located in the city of Posadas, Misiones in the Ecclesiastical province of Corrientes in Argentina.

History
On 11 February 1957, Pope Pius XII established the Diocese of Posadas from the Diocese of Corrientes.  It lost territory in 1986 when the Diocese of Puerto Iguazú was established and again in 2009 when the Diocese of Puerto Oberá was established.

Bishops

Ordinaries
Jorge Kémérer S.V.D. (1957–1986) 
Carmelo Juan Giaquinta (1986–1993), appointed Archbishop of Resistencia
Alfonso Delgado Evers (1994–2000),  appointed Archbishop of San Juan de Cuyo
Juan Rubén Martinez (2000– )

Other priest of this diocese who became bishop
Victor Selvino Arenhart, appointed Bishop of Oberá in 2009

References

Posadas
Posadas
Posadas
Posadas
Posadas, Misiones